The 1896 college football season had no clear-cut champion, with the Official NCAA Division I Football Records Book listing Lafayette and Princeton as having been selected national champions.  Lafayette finished with an 11–0–1 record while Princeton had a 10–0–1 record.  In the  second game of the season for both teams, Lafayette and Princeton played to a scoreless tie.  Both teams had signature wins: Lafayette defeated Penn 6–4, giving the Quakers their only loss of the season, while Princeton defeated previously unbeaten Yale, 24–6, on Thanksgiving Day in the last game of the season.  Princeton was retroactively named the 1896 national champions by the Billingsley Report, the Helms Athletic Foundation, the Houlgate System, and Lafayette and Princeton were named national co-champions by the National Championship Foundation and Parke Davis.

Conference and program changes

Conference changes
 The Intercollegiate Conference of Faculty Representatives, commonly known as the Western Conference and the precursor to the modern Big Ten Conference, began its first season of play in 1896 with seven founding members from across the Midwest.

Membership changes

Conference standings

Major conference standings

Independents

Minor conferences

See also
 1896 College Football All-America Team

References